Darrell Crouch (born June 9, 1964) is a former American football coach. He was the 16th head football coach at Eureka College in Eureka, Illinois, serving for five seasons, from 2000 to 2004, and compiling a record of 9–41.

Head coaching record

References

1964 births
Living people
Eureka Red Devils football coaches